Hetaerina vulnerata, the canyon rubyspot, is a species of broad-winged damselfly in the family Calopterygidae. It is found in Central America, North America, and South America.

The IUCN conservation status of Hetaerina vulnerata is "LC", least concern, with no immediate threat to the species' survival. The population is stable.

References

Further reading

 

Calopterygidae
Articles created by Qbugbot
Insects described in 1853